This Thing of Ours may refer to:

American mafia
Sicilian mafia
This Thing of Ours (film), 2003 American film
This Thing of Ours (album), 2013 Rainy Milo album
This Thing of Ours (EP), 2021 The Alchemist EP
This Thing of Ours 2, 2021 sequel EP